The Sighet Prison, located in the city of Sighetu Marmației, Maramureș County, Romania, was used by Romania to hold criminals, prisoners of war, and political prisoners. It is now the site of the Sighet Memorial Museum, part of the Memorial of the Victims of Communism.

History

The prison in Sighetu Marmației (often referred to just as "Sighet") was built in 1897, when the area was part of the Austro-Hungarian Empire, as a prison for criminal offenders. Between 1897 and 1945 here was a wonderful garden.

After 1945, at the end of World War II, the repatriation of Romanians who had been prisoners of war and deportees in the Soviet Union was done through Sighet.

Starting in August 1948, Sighet Prison was set aside for political opponents of the government. At first, it held students, pupils, and peasants from the Maramureș region. The first batch of such detainees consisted of 18 students from Dragoș Vodă High School in Sighetu Marmației, accused of demonstrating against the communist regime; they were brought in on 29 August, and were kept until May 1949, after which they were tried in Cluj and then sent to prisons in Pitești, Gherla, and Târgșor, or at the Danube–Black Sea Canal.

On the night of 5 May 1950, over one hundred former dignitaries from the whole country were brought to the Sighet penitentiary (former ministers and other politicians, as well as academics, economists, military officers, historians, and journalists), some of them sentenced to heavy punishments, and others held without any form of trial. The majority were over 60 years old. Many important figures of inter-war Romania died in custody, including the leader of the National Peasants' Party and former Prime Minister of Romania, Iuliu Maniu.

In the fall of 1950, about 45 Greek Catholic bishops and priests were brought in. Among those who died at Sighet were bishops Ioan Suciu, Tit Liviu Chinezu, Valeriu Traian Frențiu, and Anton Durcovici. Between 1950 and 1955, no death certificates were issued and the families of the deceased were not notified.

After Romania joined the United Nations in December 1955, the prison reverted to being a detention center for usual convicts, though some political prisoners were still held there until the 1964 general amnesty. In 1977 the prison closed; the building was turned into a depot, run by the town hall, and slowly fell into disrepair.

In the aftermath of the Romanian Revolution of 1989, that saw the dismantlement of the communist regime, poet Ana Blandiana presented in January 1993 to the Council of Europe a project to transform the former prison into a museum, called the "Memorial to the Victims of Communism and Resistance." On June 20, 1997, the first halls were opened and a prayer and silence space was inaugurated in the small prison courtyard, meant as a tribute to all political prisoners who died in detention in Communist Romania. The larger courtyard features the statuary group called "Sacrifice Parade," made by the sculptor .

Notable inmates 
 Constantin Argetoianu, former Prime Minister of Romania, died at Sighet in 1955
 Victor Bădulescu, economist, academician, died at Sighet in 1953–54
 Ioan Bălan, Greek-Catholic bishop of Lugoj
 Dinu Brătianu, politician and historian, committed suicide in prison in 1951
 Gheorghe I. Brătianu, politician and historian, leader of the National-Liberal Party-Brătianu, died at Sighet in 1953
 Radu Budișteanu, lawyer, politician, and activist of the Iron Guard 
 Ion Cămărășescu, politician, died at Sighet in 1953
 Nicolae Carandino, journalist and politician
 Tit Liviu Chinezu, bishop of the Greek-Catholic Church, died at Sighet in 1955 of hypothermia
 Daniel Ciugureanu, Prime minister of the Moldavian Democratic Republic, died at Sighet in 1950
 Tancred Constantinescu, engineer, former minister, died at Sighet in 1951
 Corneliu Coposu, former secretary to Iuliu Maniu, leader of the National Peasants' Party after 1989
 Ioan Dragomir, bishop of the Greek-Catholic Church
 Anton Durcovici, Roman Catholic bishop of Iași, died of forced starvation at Sighet in 1951
 Valeriu Traian Frențiu, Greek Catholic Bishop of the Eparchy of Oradea Mare, died at Sighet in 1952
 Stan Ghițescu, Vice-President of the Chamber of Deputies of Romania (1926), former Minister of Labor, died at Sighet in 1952
 Constantin C. Giurescu, historian, professor at the University of Bucharest, Royal Governor 1939, Lower Danube Province, Minister of Propaganda 1939–1940
 Ion Gruia, professor of Constitutional Law at the University of Bucharest, former Minister of Justice, died at Sighet in 1952
 Pan Halippa, president of Sfatul Țării when it voted union of Bessarabia with Romania in 1918
 Emil Hațieganu, former Minister of State
 Iuliu Hossu, Greek-Catholic bishop of Cluj-Gherla
 Alexandru Lapedatu, professor of History at the University of Cluj, former Cults and Arts Minister and State Minister, former president of the Romanian Academy and of the Senate of Romania, died at Sighet in 1950
 Ilie Lazăr, leader of the National Peasants' Party
 Ioan Lupaș, professor of History at the University of Cluj, former president of the History Section of the Romanian Academy, former Minister of Health and of Culture and Arts
 Gheorghe N. Leon, economist and politician, former Minister of Economy
 Ion Macovei, former head of the Romanian Railroads, former Minister of Public Works and Communications, died at Sighet in 1950
 Iuliu Maniu, leader of the  National Peasants' Party, former Prime Minister of Romania, died at Sighet in 1953
 Mihail Manoilescu, former Foreign Minister, died at Sighet in 1950
 Nicolae Marinescu, general and former Minister of Labor and Health
 Ioan Mihail Racoviță, general and former Minister of Defense, died at Sighet in 1954
 Ion Manolescu-Strunga, economist, former Minister of Industry and Commerce, died at Sighet in 1951
 Ion Mihalache, leader of the National Peasants' Party, former Minister of the Interior
 Ion Nistor, historian and former Minister of Cults and the Arts
 Nicolae Păiș, naval officer, former minister, died at Sighet in 1952
 Nicolae Penescu, lawyer and politician, former Minister of the Interior
 Constantin Titel Petrescu, leader of the Social-Democratic Party, who opposed fusion with the Communist Party of Romania
 Ioan Ploscaru, bishop of the Greek-Catholic Church
 Mihail Priboianu, engineer, former minister
 Ioan Rășcanu, general and former Minister of Defense, died at Sighet in 1952
 Alexander Ratiu, author and priest in Giurtelecu Şimleului
 Alexandru Rusu, Greek-Catholic bishop of Baia Mare
 Nicolae Samsonovici, general and former Minister of Defense, died at Sighet in 1950
Ioan Gheorghe Savin, theologian within the Romanian Orthodox Church
 Joseph Schubert, Titular Bishop of the Roman Catholic Church
 Ioan Suciu, bishop of the Greek-Catholic Church, died at Sighet in 1953
 Gheorghe Tașcă, economist, former Minister of Industry and Commerce, leader of the National Peasants' Party, died at Sighet in 1951
 Gheorghe Tătărescu, leader of the National Liberal Party-Tătărescu, former Prime Minister of Romania
 Alexandru Todea, Greek-Catholic bishop of the Alba Iulia Diocese

Gallery

References

External links

1897 establishments in Romania
Socialist Republic of Romania
Defunct prisons in Romania
Prison
Buildings and structures in Maramureș County
Political repression in Romania
19th-century architecture in Romania